In enzymology, a pyrogallol 1,2-oxygenase is an enzyme that catalyzes the chemical reaction

1,2,3-trihydroxybenzene + O2  (Z)-5-oxohex-2-enedioate

Thus, the two substrates of this enzyme are 1,2,3-trihydroxybenzene and O2, whereas its product is (Z)-5-oxohex-2-enedioate.

This enzyme belongs to the family of oxidoreductases, specifically those acting on single donors with O2 as oxidant and incorporation of two atoms of oxygen into the substrate (oxygenases). The oxygen incorporated need not be derived from O2.  The systematic name of this enzyme class is 1,2,3-trihydroxybenzene:oxygen 1,2-oxidoreductase (decyclizing). This enzyme is also called pyrogallol 1,2-dioxygenase.

References

 

EC 1.13.11
Enzymes of unknown structure